Lentorbis is a genus of air-breathing freshwater snails, aquatic pulmonate gastropod mollusks in the family Planorbidae, the ram's horn snails.

All species within family Planorbidae have sinistral shells.

Distribution
This genus lives in Africa.

Species
Species within this genus include:
 Lentorbis carringtoni (de Azevedo et al., 1961)
 Lentorbis junodi (Connolly, 1922)

References

Planorbidae